Matteo Berrettini and Fabio Fognini were the defending champions, but Fognini chose not to participate this year. Berrettini played alongside Simone Bolelli, but lost in the final to Divij Sharan and Igor Zelenay, 3–6, 6–3, [8–10].

Seeds

Draw

Draw

References

External Links
 Main Draw

St. Petersburg Open - Doubles
St. Petersburg Open